Lozi people, or Barotse, are a southern African ethnic group who speak Lozi or Silozi, a Sotho–Tswana language. The Lozi people consist of more than 46 different ethnic groups and are primarily situated between Namibia, Angola, Botswana, Zimbabwe including half of North-Western and western province of Zambia inhabiting the region of Barotseland. 

Lozi is also a nationality of the people of Barotseland, an amalgamation of several smaller ethnic groups and tribes. The Lozi people number approximately 5,575,000. Lozi are also found in Zambia, Namibia (Caprivi Strip), Angola, Botswana, Mozambique (50,000), and Zimbabwe (8,000). The Lozi are also known as the Malozi, Nyambe, Makololo, Barotose, Rotse, Rozi, Rutse, Baloyi, Balobedu or Tozvi.

Name
The word Lozi means 'plain' in the Makololo language, in reference to the Barotse Floodplain of the Zambezi on and around which most Lozi live. It may also be spelled Lotse or Rotse, the spelling Lozi having originated with German missionaries in what is now Namibia. Mu- and Ba- are corresponding singular and plural prefixes for certain nouns in the Silos language, so Murotse means 'person of the plain' while Barotse means 'people of the plain.

History

Lozi tradition states that they have always inhabited Barotseland. In about 1830, an army that originated in the Sotho-speaking Bafokeng region of South Africa, known as the Makololo, led by a warrior called Sebetwane, invaded Barotseland and conquered the Lozi. They ruled until 1864 when the Sotho clique was overthrown following a Lozi revolt.

The political organisation of the Lozi has long centred on a monarchy, whose reigning head, the Paramount King, is known as 'Litunga' which means 'keeper of the earth.' The renowned Litunga Lewanika, whose latter name was a nickname from the Mbunda meaning "unifier" following the Lozi revolt, reigned from 1878 to 1916 with a short insurrectionist break in 1884-85, requested Queen Victoria to bring Barotseland under protectorate status. Great Britain, however, was uninterested in acquiring the territory. A granting of a royal charter for the British South Africa Company of Cecil Rhodes allowed the company to acquire Barotseland under the guise of the British government. Although under protectorate status, Lewanika eventually realized that he had been tricked and petitioned for the protectorate status to be corrected. Yet, the land remained under Rhodes's control, and when the territory failed to produce gold, copper or other exports, the "British South Africa Company defaulted on every commitment it had made to Lewanika," and few developments in infrastructure and education were made.

Although Barotseland was incorporated into Northern Rhodesia, it retained a large degree of autonomy, which was carried over when Northern Rhodesia became Zambia on its independence in 1964. In the run-up to independence, the Litunga, the Ngambela (Prime Minister) and about a dozen senior indunas went to London for talks with the Colonial Office, in an attempt to have Barotseland remain a Protectorate. The Litunga, Sir Mwanawina Lewenika III, quoted his grandfather's words to Queen Victoria, that "My country is your blanket, and my people are but the fleas in your blanket." Although before colonial times, the region was self-sufficient in food and exported crops to neighbouring regions, today it is the least-developed region of Zambia, with only one major road into the province, from Lusaka to Mongu, and only intermittent supplies of electricity.

Culture

Lozi society is highly stratified, with a monarch at the top and those of recent royal descent occupying high positions in society. The monarch or Barotse Royal Establishment (BRE) is known as Mulonga, and Lozi society tolerates little criticism even of an unpopular Litunga. Criticisms of a Litunga by a foreigner are treated as criticisms of the Lozi nation as a whole. The Lozi are not separate into clans, unlike most African ethnic groups.

Lozi culture is strongly influenced by the flood cycle of the Zambezi river, with annual migrations taking place from the flood plain to higher ground at the start of the wet season. The most important of these festivals is the Kuomboka, in which the Litunga moves from Lealui in the flood plain to Limulunga on higher ground. The Kuomboka usually takes place in February or March. These annual floods displace hundreds of people every year.

Language

Notes

References
Barotseland.com
A history of the Lozi

External links

 An organisation promoting the development of the Lozi people
 Information on the Kuomboka

 
Barotseland
Ethnic groups in Angola
Ethnic groups in Botswana
Ethnic groups in Namibia
Ethnic groups in Zambia